Larry O'Connor (born April 1, 1950) is a Canadian former professional ice hockey defenceman.

Early life 
O'Connor was born in Montreal. He played junior hockey in the Quebec Major Junior Hockey League (QMJHL), and was recognized for his outstanding performance when he was selected to the 1969–70 QMJHL First All-Star Team.

Career 
O'Connor played five seasons of professional hockey, including 125 games in the CHL with the Omaha Knights and Albuquerque Six-Guns, and 80 games played in the AHL with the Providence Reds.

Awards and honors

References

External links

1950 births
Living people
Anglophone Quebec people
Albuquerque Six-Guns players
Canadian ice hockey defencemen
Denver Spurs players
Des Moines Oak Leafs players
Ice hockey people from Montreal
Jersey Devils players
Laval Saints players
Omaha Knights (CHL) players
Port Huron Flags players
Providence Reds players